The 1933 Giro d'Italia was the 21st edition of the Giro d'Italia, organized and sponsored by the newspaper La Gazzetta dello Sport. The race was won by the Alfredo Binda of the Legnano team. Second and third respectively were the Belgian Jef Demuysere and Italian Domenico Piemontesi.

This 20th edition covered 3,343 km at an average speed of 30.043 km/h, for a total of 17 stages.

Participants

Of the 97 riders that began the Giro d'Italia on 6 May, 51 of them made it to the finish in Milan on 28 May. Riders were allowed to ride on their own or as a member of a team; 51 riders competed as members of a team, while the remaining 46 were independent riders. There were nine teams that competed in the race: Bestetti-d'Alessandro, Bianchi-Pirelli, Dei-Pirelli, Ganna-Hutchinson, Girardengo-Clément, Gloria-Hutchinson, Legnano-Hutchinson, Maino-Clément, and Olympia-Spiga.

The peloton was primarily composed of Italians. The field featured five former Giro d'Italia champions in four-time winner Alfredo Binda, two-time champion Costante Girardengo, single race winners Luigi Marchisio and Francesco Camusso, and reigning winner Antonio Pesenti. Other notable Italian riders that started the race included Learco Guerra, Giuseppe Olmo, Remo Bertoni, Felice Gremo, and Domenico Piemontesi. Notable non-Italian entrants included: Previous year podium finisher Jef Demuysere, Spanish climber Vicente Trueba, and renowned French cyclist René Vietto. Of all the entrants, Guerra was seen as the favorite to win the race after his victory in the Milan–San Remo earlier in the season.

Route and stages

La Gazzetta announced the route in March 1933.

Classification leadership

The leader of the general classification – calculated by adding the stage finish times of each rider – wore a pink jersey. This classification is the most important of the race, and its winner is considered as the winner of the Giro. Race organizers chose to remove time bonuses for the sprint stage winners, the "winner for detachment," the first riders who cross a mountain. The winner of the individual time trial – where riders contest the course starting in three minute increments – awarded a time bonus of two minutes and one minute to the first and second-place finishers, respectively.

The race organizers allowed isolated riders to compete in the race, which had a separate classification calculated the same way as the general classification. For the leader of this classification, a white jersey was awarded.

In the mountains classification, the race organizers selected different mountains that the route crossed and awarded points to the riders who crossed them first. There were four mountains that were given points towards the mountains classification: the Passo del Tonale, the Osteria della Crocetta, the Castelnuovo della Daunia, and the Castelnuovo Val di Cecina. Alfredo Binda was the first rider to cross each of the four mountains.

The winner of the team classification was determined by adding the finish times of the best three cyclists per team together and the team with the lowest total time was the winner. If a team had fewer than three riders finish, they were not eligible for the classification.

Il Trofeo Magno was a classification for independent Italian riders competing in the race. The riders were divided into teams based on the region of Italy they were from. The calculation of the standings was the same for the team classification. At the end of the race, a trophy was awarded to the winning team and it was then stored at the Federal Secretary of the P.N.P. in their respective province.

The rows in the following table correspond to the jerseys awarded after that stage was run.

Final standings

General classification

Foreign rider classification

Independent rider classification

Isolati rider classification

Mountains classification

Team classification

Il Trofeo Magno classification

References

Footnotes

Citations

Bibliography

 
G
Giro d'Italia
Giro d'Italia
Giro d'Italia by year